Spanish Fidelist Group of Cuba was a group of Spanish leftwing exiles in Cuba. The group existed in the early 1960s.

The group published Lucha revolucionaria.

References

Communist parties in Spain
Exile organizations
Spanish-Cuban culture
Spanish expatriates in Cuba